Balmain West ferry wharf (also known as Elliott Street ferry wharf) is located on Iron Cove serving the Sydney suburb of Balmain.

History
Until October 2013, It was served by Sydney Ferries Parramatta River services operating between Circular Quay and Cockatoo Island. The single wharf was served by First Fleet class ferries. The service was withdrawn due to low patronage.

References

Ferry wharves in Sydney